Sick: Survive the Night is a 2012 Canadian horror film directed by Ryan M. Andrews, written by Andrews and Chris Cull, and starring Christina Annie Aceto, Richard Sutton, Robert Nolan, and Debbie Rochon.  Survivors of a zombie apocalypse attempt to find a cure and stay alive overnight during a siege.

Plot 
Survivors in a military bunker recruit Dr. Leigh Rozetta, a scientist, to find a cure for the zombie plague that has ravaged humanity.  When she retreats to her parents' house, several survivalists join her along the way.  The group attempts to survive the zombie hordes while dealing with their interpersonal issues.

Cast 
 Christina Annie Aceto as Dr. Leigh Rozetta
 Richard Sutton as Seph Copeland
 Robert Nolan as Mckay Jacobs
 Jennifer Polansky as Claudia Silveira
 Debbie Rochon as Dr. Joselda Fehmi
 Rodrigo Fernandez-Stoll as Jackson

Production 
The film was originally intended to be a short.  When the plot developed beyond these limits, it was converted into a feature-length production.  Andrews wanted to create a unique mythology for his film, so he worked to differentiate his zombies from the ones that he had seen in other films.  One of his ideas was to take a meme associated with zombie films, that zombies eat brains, treat it seriously, and add a scientific rationale.

Release 
Sick: Survive the Night premiered at the Blood on the Snow Canadian Film Festival.  Midnight Releasing released it on home video on January 6, 2015.

Reception 
Lacey Paige of Diabolique Magazine called it "a decent little independent zombie film" that "offers a unique take" on a tired subgenre.  Dominic Cuthbert of Starburst rated it 5/10 stars and wrote, "Given its low budget, Andrews taps into the indie spirit with gusto, putting drama over horror, and while the blood doesn’t splatter every which way, the performances fail to ignite."  C. Rachel Katz of Influx Magazine rated it C and wrote, "In the end, Sick is a mixed bag of creative potential and questionable plot lines."  Matt Boiselle of Dread Central rated it 2.5/5 stars and wrote that it does not distinguish itself from the glut of other low-budget zombie films.

References

External links 
 

2012 films
2012 horror films
2012 independent films
2010s science fiction horror films
Canadian science fiction horror films
Canadian independent films
Canadian post-apocalyptic films
Canadian zombie films
English-language Canadian films
2010s English-language films
2010s Canadian films